Thiruthalaiyur is a village panchayat located in the Tiruchirappalli district of Tamil Nadu state, India.

Villages in Tiruchirappalli district